FC Dynamo Kirov is a Russian association football club from Kirov, founded in 1923. It plays in the Russian Amateur Football League. It played on the professional level in 1937, 1957 to 1994, and from 1999 to 2017. The highest level it ever achieved was the second highest (Soviet First League and Russian First Division), where it played in 1957–1962, 1982, 1983, and 1992. It was called Dynamo Vyatka (1923–1934 before the city of Vyatka was renamed to Kirov), Vyatka Kirov (1993–1996), Mashinostroitel Kirov (1997–1998), and Dynamo-Mashinostroitel Kirov (1999–2003).

On 18 July 2017, the club voluntarily left the third-tier Russian Professional Football League due to lack of financing.

References

External links
Official website

Association football clubs established in 1923
Football clubs in Russia
Sport in Kirov, Kirov Oblast
1923 establishments in Russia